District 3 of the Texas Senate is a senatorial district that serves all of Anderson, Angelina, Cherokee, Hardin, Henderson, Houston, Jasper, Nacogdoches, Newton, Polk, Sabine, San Augustine, San Jacinto, Shelby, Trinity and Tyler counties, and portions of Montgomery and Smith counties in the U.S. state of Texas. The current Senator from District 3 is Robert Nichols.

Election history
Election history of District 3 from 1992.

Past elections

2018

2014

2012

2006

2002

2000

1996

1994

1992

District officeholders

References

03